The Gay Nighties is a 1933 American pre-Code comedy film featuring Clark & McCullough and directed by Mark Sandrich.

Plot summary
Clark & McCullough, as Hives and Blodgett, are campaign managers for political candidate Oliver Beezley. They plan to defeat Beezley's political rival, Commodore Amos Pipp (James Finlayson), by exploiting his weakness for women. Blodgett is to be disguised as a beautiful woman to entrap Pipp, but with his moustache he proves unconvincing in drag—Hives declares, "Even the Commodore wouldn't fall for a buzzard like you!"—and Hives instead enlists the help of Mrs. Beezley (Dorothy Granger) to carry out the scheme.

First, though, they have to stay out of the line of fire, and ahead of the police, the nearsighted house detective (Monte Collins), a sleepy man with a cot (Charles Williams), and a somnambulist Countess (Sandra Shaw) with her afghan hound.

Cast
Bobby Clark as B. Oglethorpe Hives
Paul McCullough as Blodgett
James Finlayson as Mr. Pipp
Dorothy Granger as Mrs. Beezley
John Sheehan as Mr. Beezley
Monte Collins as Hotel Detective
Sandra Shaw as Countess
Charles Williams as Sleepy Man

External links

1933 films
1933 comedy films
RKO Pictures short films
American black-and-white films
American comedy short films
Films directed by Mark Sandrich
1930s English-language films
1930s American films